Flatman is a surname. Notable people with the surname include:

Barry Flatman, Canadian actor
David Flatman (born 1980), English rugby player
Frederick Flatman (1843–1911), New Zealand Member of Parliament
Nat Flatman, 19th-century English champion jockey
Thomas Flatman (1637–1688), English poet and miniature painter

See also
Flatman (comics), Marvel Comics character and member of the Great Lakes Avengers